John Marshall Cunningham (July 28, 1915 – June 4, 2002) was an American author who wrote a number of Western novels and stories as "John W. Cunningham" or "John M. Cunningham."

He was born July 28, 1915, at Deer Lodge, Montana, the son of John and Sue Cunningham.  During the Second World War, he served in the U.S. Army in the South Pacific. While living in Santa Barbara, California, he became a published novelist. He moved to Ashland, Oregon in 1985, where he lived until his death.

His most famous work was "The Tin Star", a short story which appeared in Collier's Magazine in 1947. It was adapted into the film High Noon in 1952, which starred Gary Cooper (Academy Award, Best Actor) and Grace Kelly. The adapted screenplay by Carl Foreman was nominated for an Academy Award.

His sister Julia Cunningham was an author of children's literature.

Works

Novels
Warhorse (1956)
"Starfall" (1960)
Rainbow Runner (1992)

Short stories
"The Tin Star" (1947) (available on the internet at http://erginguney.com/web/coursematerial/The_Tin_star.pdf)
"Yankee Gold" (1953)
"Day of the Bad Man" (1958)

References

External links

1915 births
2002 deaths
20th-century American novelists
American male novelists
Western (genre) writers
American male short story writers
20th-century American short story writers
20th-century American male writers